Valseutypella is a genus of fungi in the family Gnomoniaceae. The genus contains two species.

References

External links 

 Valseutypella at Index Fungorum

Gnomoniaceae
Sordariomycetes genera